Take a Look Over Your Shoulder is the second studio album by the G-funk rapper Warren G. It was released on March 25, 1997 under his own label G-Funk Entertainment and Def Jam Recordings. It contains the hits "I Shot the Sheriff" (US#20, UK#2), and "Smokin' Me Out" (US#35, UK#14). The album was certified gold in America. The lyrics off the track "Reality" were also used in Prince Igor, a collaboration with The Rapsody and Sissel Kyrkjebø.

Track listing 

Samples
"I Shot the Sheriff"
"Kissing My Love" by Bill Withers
"I Shot the Sheriff" by Eric Clapton
"Love's Gonna Get'cha (Material Love)" by Boogie Down Productions
"Strictly Business" by EPMD
"Relax Ya Mind"
"I Do Love You" by GQ
"You Gots to Chill" by EPMD
"Smokin' Me Out"
"Coolin' Me Out" by The Isley Brothers
"Can You Feel It"
"Can You Feel It?" by Fat Boys
"What We Go Through"
"Action" by Orange Krush
"Transformers"
"Stay" by The Controllers

Certifications

Credits
 Marketing: David A. Belgrave

References

Warren G albums
1997 albums
Def Jam Recordings albums
G-funk albums
Albums produced by Warren G